1968 assassination may refer to:
 Assassination of Martin Luther King Jr. on April 4.
 Assassination of Robert F. Kennedy on June 5.

1968
Assassinations